Morgan Taylor Reid is a Grammy Award nominated music producer, singer-songwriter and recording artist based in Los Angeles. As an artist, Reid's music has been licensed for television including his song "Brighter" that was featured in the Season 7 finale of Grey's Anatomy, his song "Simply Human" featured on House (Season 8, Episode 9 FOX) and his song "Where Do I Even Start?" featured in Season 8, Episode 8 of Grey's Anatomy. After being featured on Grey's Anatomy, "Where Do I Even Start?" reached #74 on the Top 100 Alternative Songs on iTunes.

As a songwriter and record producer, Reid has worked with several artists including the Backstreet Boys. Reid wrote and produced five songs on the Backstreet Boys album In A World Like This including their single "Show 'Em (What You're Made Of)". Reid also produced their holiday single "It's Christmas Time Again", which he wrote with Backstreet Boys members Nick Carter and Howie Dorough along with songwriter Mika Guillory.

Producing career

Reid lives and works in Los Angeles. He has written and produced several songs for artists such as Backstreet Boys, Megan Nicole (Bad Boy Records), Plug in Stereo (Atlantic Records), Shane Harper (Deep Well Records (Adam Anders) and several indie artists.

In April 2011, Reid began co-producing with record producer RedOne. They worked on music for the band 7Lions (2101 Records/Universal Music Group). Reid wrote, produced and developed the debut EP Born 2 Run for the band 7Lions. After its release on June 19, 2012, the Born 2 Run album debuted on the Billboard Hot 100 charts at #15 on the Alternative Chart and #33 on the New Artist Chart.

In addition to the Backstreet Boys 2012 Christmas single "It's Christmas Time Again", Reid also wrote and produced five tracks on the Backstreet Boys 2013 album; In a World Like This.

Reid has been working with artist Grace Mitchell since she was 14 years old. On December 17, 2013, the soundtrack to the film The Secret Life of Walter Mitty was released, it featured a cover of Hall & Oates's Maneater performed by Mitchell and produced by Reid. At the age of seventeen, Mitchell released her debut album; Design – EP, on Universal Republic Records.

Solo artist career

Reid's solo album is called Simply Human. It is an acoustic album. The single "Stay Where You Are" was used in a Levi's campaign. The album's songs "Brighter" and "Where Do I Even Start?" were used on Grey's Anatomy.  After being featured on Grey's Anatomy,  "Where Do I Even Start?" reached #74 on the Top 100 Alternative Songs on iTunes. Reid's song "Simply Human" was featured on the show House in 2012.

On November 21, 2012, Reid released a single, called "Science", which he wrote with CTodd Nielsen and Matt Mugford. The single was released the same day it was featured on Private Practice.

Discography

Awards

Grammy Awards

|-
|-
| 2019 || Head Over Heels || Best Engineered Album, Non-Classical || 
|-
|-

Juno Awards

|-
|-
| 2019 || Head Over Heels || Pop Album of the Year || 
|-
|-

References

External links 
 

1985 births
Living people
American male singer-songwriters
American pop rock singers
American rock songwriters
Singer-songwriters from California
Musicians from Santa Rosa, California
Record producers from California
American multi-instrumentalists
American alternative rock musicians
American indie rock musicians
American rock guitarists
American male guitarists
Writers from Santa Rosa, California
Guitarists from California
American male pianists
21st-century American singers
21st-century American pianists
21st-century American guitarists
21st-century American male singers